WTGL (channel 45), branded on-air as Good Life 45, is a religious independent television station licensed to Leesburg, Florida, United States, serving the Orlando area. The station is locally owned by Good Life Broadcasting, and maintains studios in Lake Mary, Florida. Through a channel sharing agreement with PBS member station WUCF-TV (channel 24), the two stations transmit using WUCF-TV's spectrum from an antenna near Bithlo.

WTGL airs programming from Total Living Network, World Harvest Television and The Worship Network. Prior to mid-2010, it was affiliated with Faith TV until that network became My Family TV. That network has since moved to low-power station WSCF-LD (channel 31).

History
The original construction permit for Channel 45 was granted to the Central Florida Educational Television, Inc. (a now-defunct division of the Central Florida Educational Foundation, the owner of FM radio station WPOZ) in 1987.  It was assigned the call letters WLCB-TV, which stood for "Leesburg Community Broadcasting", after the station's city of license.  However, Central Florida Educational Television was never able to get the station on the air, so it sold the construction permit and partially completed transmitting facility to Good Life Broadcasting (then owner of then-WTGL-TV Channel 52) in May 2000, after the FCC began to permit duopolies. Once Good Life secured the permit, it completed the construction of its transmitting facility, and the station signed on for the first time on December 12, 2000. WLCB took a mix of general entertainment and religious programming. They ran a mix of westerns, old sitcoms, public domain movies, some lifestyle shows, and initially cartoons, which by 2003 were gone. Their original station, then called WTGL continued on with an all Christian/religious format.

Good Life owned and operated both its original station and WLCB until September 2006, when the original WTGL was sold to TBN and its call sign was subsequently changed to WHLV-TV. Good Life continues to host WHLV's master control operations to the present day even though WHLV has since moved to its own studio facility. The two stations shared a studio on the corner of I-4 and Michigan Avenue in Orlando until June 2007, when Channel 45 and the master controls for Channel 52 were moved to the former studios of WKCF in Lake Mary.

With the WTGL callsign made available since the original WTGL became WHLV-TV, WLCB officially changed its call sign to WTGL (without the -TV suffix) on September 12, 2007. Even though the -TV suffix is missing from Channel 45's legal call sign, the station continues to use the -TV suffix on-air and on its website. As of 2021, the station shares spectrum with PBS member station WUCF-TV on UHF channel 34.

Programming
WTGL airs many Christian programs as well as classic family programs. Christian programs seen on WTGL include The Gaither Homecoming Hour, The Good Life, The Active Word and many others. Classic TV programs include The Adventures of Ozzie and Harriet, The Lone Ranger and The Flying Nun.

Technical information

Subchannel

Analog-to-digital conversion
WTGL shut down its analog signal, over UHF channel 45, on February 17, 2009, the original target date in which full-power television stations in the United States were to transition from analog to digital broadcasts under federal mandate (which was later pushed back to June 12, 2009). The station's digital signal continued to broadcasts on its pre-transition UHF channel 46. Through the use of PSIP, digital television receivers display the station's virtual channel as its former UHF analog channel 45. On March 9, 2018, WTGL began simulcasting via WUCF-TV; the station ceased broadcasting on RF channel 46 on March 28, 2018.

References

External links
Official website

Television channels and stations established in 2000
2000 establishments in Florida
TGL
TGL